Events in the year 1999 in Spain.

Incumbents 
 Monarch – Juan Carlos I
 Prime Minister of Spain – José María Aznar

Events 
14 September - Britannia Airways Flight 226A, a charter flight from Cardiff, crashes at Girona Airport, resulting in one death and 43 injuries. 
9 October - Beginning of the Wanninkhof case: Rocío Wanninkhof leaves home never to return; her body is found several weeks later.

Undated 
Virtway game development studio is founded in Oviedo.
Web Medica Acreditada, an international website quality and certification programme

Popular culture

Music
See :Category:1999 in Spanish music

Film
See :Category:1999 in Spanish cinema

Television 
See :Category:1999 in Spanish television

Literature

Sport 
See :Category:1999 in Spanish sport

Notable births 
19 February - Hugo Gonzalez, swimmer
3 August - Brahim Díaz, footballer
13 September - Pedro Porro, footballer

Notable deaths 
27 January – Gonzalo Torrente Ballester, writer (b. 1910)
20 April – Señor Wences, ventriloquist and comedian (b. 1896)
6 July – Joaquín Rodrigo, pianist and composer (b. 1901)
10 September – Alfredo Kraus, operatic tenor (b. 1927)
28 October – Rafael Alberti, poet (b. 1902)
17 November – Enrique Urquijo, singer-songwriter (b. 1960; drug overdose)

References

External links

 
Spain
Years of the 20th century in Spain
Spain